A coup d'état in Haiti on 29 February 2004, following several weeks of conflict, resulted in the removal of President Jean-Bertrand Aristide from office. On 5 February 2004, a rebel group, called the National Revolutionary Front for the Liberation and Reconstruction of Haiti, took control of Haiti's fourth-largest city, Gonaïves. By 22 February, the rebels had captured Haiti's second-largest city, Cap-Haïtien and were besieging the capital, Port-au-Prince by the end of February. On the morning of 29 February, Aristide resigned under controversial circumstances and was flown from Haiti by U.S. military/security personnel. He went into exile, being flown directly to the Central African Republic, before eventually settling in South Africa.

Aristide afterwards claimed that he had been "kidnapped" by U.S. forces, accusing them of having orchestrated a coup d'état against him, a claim denied by U.S. officials. In 2022, a dozen Haitian and French officials told The New York Times that Aristide's earlier calls for reparations had caused France to side with Aristide's opponents and collaborate with the United States to remove him from power, however this was denied by the United States Ambassador to Haiti at the time, James Brendan Foley.

Following Aristide's departure, an interim government led by Prime Minister Gérard Latortue and President Boniface Alexandre was installed.

Events prior to the coup d'état

Controversy over Aristide's election in 2000
The opposition in Haiti accused the government party of election fraud in the Haitian general election, 2000, as did Europe and the United States. The National Coalition for Haitian Rights (NCHR) stated that there were delays in the distribution of voter identification cards. U.S. Congressman John Conyers wrote:

In contrast, Aristide's supporters claim that an opposition boycott of the election was used as a ploy in order to discredit it.

In response to this election, European nations suspended government-to-government assistance to Haiti. The U.S. Congress banned any U.S. assistance from being channeled through the Haitian government, codifying an existing situation.

Aristide's request for reparations from France

In 2003, Aristide requested that France pay Haiti over US$21 billion in reparations, which he said was the equivalent in today's money of the 90 million gold francs Haiti was forced to pay Paris after winning independence from France 200 years ago.

The United Nations Security Council, of which France is a permanent member, rejected a 26 February 2004, appeal from the Caribbean Community (CARICOM) for international peacekeeping forces to be sent into its member state Haiti, but voted unanimously to send in troops three days later, just hours after Aristide's forced resignation.

"I believe that (the call for reparations) could have something to do with it, because they (France) were definitely not happy about it, and made some very hostile comments," Myrtha Desulme, chairperson of the Haiti-Jamaica Exchange Committee, told IPS. "(But) I believe that he did have grounds for that demand, because that is what started the downfall of Haiti," she says."

Following the 2004 Haitian coup d'état, the appointed provisional prime minister Gerard Latortue rescinded the reparations demand, calling it "foolish" and "illegal".

Cross-border paramilitary campaign against Haiti's state 2001–2004
The role of rightwing paramilitary groups in violently targeting activists and government officials aligned with the Aristide government has been well documented. Freedom of Information Act documents have shown how paramilitary forces received support from sectors of Haiti's elite as well as from sectors of the Dominican military and government at the time. According to researcher Jeb Sprague, these groups also had contact with U.S. and French intelligence. While the paramilitary campaign was launched in late 2001 and immediately targeted key governmental infrastructure in Port-au-Prince, during 2002 and 2003 it targeted rural areas of the country. In early 2004, paramilitary forces launched a ramped up offensive into the country.

Ottawa Initiative
The Ottawa Initiative on Haiti was a conference hosted by Canada that took place at Meech Lake, Quebec (a federal government resort near Ottawa) on 31 January and 1 February 2003, to decide the future of Haiti's government, though no Haitian government officials were invited. The conference was attended by Canadian, French, and U.S. and Latin American officials.

Journalist Michel Vastel leaked information about the conference that he says was told to him by his friend and conference host Denis Paradis, Canada's Secretary of State for Latin America, Africa, and the French-speaking world, in his 15 March 2003, article in Quebec news magazine L'actualité. In the article, he claims that the officials at the conference wanted to see regime change in Haiti in less than a year. "Michel Vastel wrote that the possibility of Aristide's departure, the need for a potential trusteeship over Haiti, and the return of Haiti's dreaded military were discussed by Paradis and the French Minister for La Francophonie, Pierre-André Wiltzer." Paradis later denied this, but neither Vastel nor L'actualite retracted the story.

Student protests
Multiple protests by Haitian students were organized in 2002, 2003 and 2004 against the Aristide government. On 5 December 2003, some of Aristide's supporters, backed by the police according to witnesses, entered the social studies department of the Université d'État d'Haïti to attack students who were rallying for an anti-government protest later that day. Dozens of students were injured and the University dean had his legs broken. This tragic event led to more protests by students, eventually joined by other groups. A student protest against Aristide on 7 January 2004 led to a clash with police and Aristide supporters that left two dead.

Coup d'état
In September 2003, Amiot Métayer was found dead, his eyes shot out and his heart cut out, most likely the result of machete-inflicted wounds. He was, prior to his death, the leader of the Gonaives gang known as "The Cannibal Army." After his death, his brother Buteur Métayer swore vengeance against those he felt responsible for Amiot's death—namely, President Jean-Bertrand Aristide. Buteur took charge of the Cannibal Army and promptly renamed it the National Revolutionary Front for the Liberation of Haiti.  In October 2003, France tasked philosopher Régis Debray with leading a commission in Haiti to improve bilateral relations, though strictly instructed him to not discuss potential reparations. In December 2003, Debray said that he had visited the presidential palace to warn Aristide not to have a fate like President of Chile Salvador Allende, who died during the 1973 Chilean coup, with the philosopher telling the president that the United States was planning his overthrow.

On 5 February 2004, this rebel group seized control of Haiti's fourth-largest city, Gonaïves, marking the beginning of a minor revolt against Aristide. During their sack of the city, they burned the police station and looted it for weapons and vehicles, which they used to continue their campaign down the coast. By 22 February, the rebels had captured Haiti's second-largest city, Cap-Haïtien. As the end of February approached, rebels threatened to take the capital, Port-au-Prince, fueling increasing political unrest and the building of barricades throughout the capital. Haitians fled their country on boats, seeking to get to the United States.  

On the morning of 29 February 2004, Deputy Chief of Mission Luis G. Moreno arrive at the presidential palace with Diplomatic Security Service officers and asked President Aristide for a resignation letter. The resignation letter was written in Haitian Creole and its wording was unclear. That same day, Canadian special forces secured Haiti’s main airport after which Aristide was flown out of the country on a U.S. plane accompanied by US security personnel as the rebels took over the capital and was flown without knowledge of his route and destination. At the time of the flight, France contacted three African nations in attempts to accept Aristide, though they refused, with the Central African Republic ultimately accepting the ousted president who arrived in Bangui via Antigua.

Many international politicians, including members of the U.S. congress and the Jamaican Prime Minister, expressed concern that the United States had interfered with Haiti's democratic process, accusing them of removing Aristide with excessive force. According to Rep. Maxine Waters D-California, Mildred Aristide called her at her home at 6:30 am to inform her "the coup d'etat has been completed", and Jean-Bertrand Aristide said the U.S. Embassy in Haiti's chief of staff came to his house to say he would be killed "and a lot of Haitians would be killed" if he refused to resign immediately and said he "has to go now." Rep. Charles Rangel, D-New York expressed similar words, saying Aristide had told him he was "disappointed that the international community had let him down" and "that he resigned under pressure" – "As a matter of fact, he was very apprehensive for his life. They made it clear that he had to go now or he would be killed." When asked for his response to these statements Colin Powell said that "it might have been better for members of Congress who have heard these stories to ask us about the stories before going public with them so we don't make a difficult situation that much more difficult" and he alleged that Aristide "did not democratically govern or govern well". Jamaican Prime Minister P. J. Patterson released a statement saying "we are bound to question whether his resignation was truly voluntary, as it comes after the capture of sections of Haiti by armed insurgents and the failure of the international community to provide the requisite support. The removal of President Aristide in these circumstances sets a dangerous precedent for democratically elected governments anywhere and everywhere, as it promotes the removal of duly elected persons from office by the power of rebel forces."

Aftermath
Supreme Court Chief Justice Boniface Alexandre succeeded Aristide as interim president and petitioned the United Nations Security Council for the intervention of an international peacekeeping force. The Security Council passed a resolution the same day, "[t]aking note of the resignation of Jean-Bertrand Aristide as President of Haiti and the swearing-in of President Boniface Alexandre as the acting President of Haiti
in accordance with the Constitution of Haiti" and authorized such a mission. 

As a vanguard of the official UN force and Operation Secure Tomorrow, a force of about 1,000 United States Marines arrived in Haïti within the day, and Canadian, French and Chilean troops arrived the next morning; the United Nations indicated it would send a team to assess the situation within days.

On 1 June 2004, the peacekeeping mission was passed to MINUSTAH and comprised a 7000-person force led by Brazil and backed up by Argentina, Chile, Jordan, Morocco, Nepal, Peru, Philippines, Spain, Sri Lanka and Uruguay.

In November 2004, the University of Miami School of Law carried out a Human Rights Investigation in Haiti and documented serious human rights abuses. It stated that "Summary executions are a police tactic." It also stated the following:
U.S. officials blame the crisis on armed gangs in the poor neighborhoods, not the official abuses and atrocities, nor the unconstitutional ouster of the elected president. Their support for the interim government is not surprising, as top officials, including the Minister of Justice, worked for U.S. government projects that undermined their elected predecessors. Coupled with the U.S. government’s development assistance embargo from 2000–2004, the projects suggest a disturbing pattern.

On 15 October 2005, Brazil called for more troops to be sent due to the worsening situation in the country.

A number of figures from Haiti's past re-appeared in government after the rebellion, including Hérard Abraham at the Ministry of the Interior, Williams Régala (a former aide to Henri Namphy) and Colonel Henri-Robert Marc-Charles, a member of the post-1991 military junta.

In the Haitian general election, 2006, René Préval was elected president.

CARICOM
CARICOM (The Caribbean Community) governments denounced the removal of Aristide from government. They also questioned the legality of the new government. The Prime Minister of Jamaica, P. J. Patterson, said that the episode set "a dangerous precedent for democratically elected governments anywhere and everywhere, as it promotes the removal of duly elected persons from office by the power of rebel forces."

As reported by the BBC, on 3 March 2004, CARICOM called for an independent inquiry into the departure of former Haitian President Jean-Bertrand Aristide and says it would not be sending peacekeepers. Patterson said there had been no indication during discussions with the U.S. and France that the plan which CARICOM had put forward prior to Aristide's departure was not acceptable. "In respect of our partners we can only say this, at no time in our discussions did they convey to us that the plan was unacceptable so long as president Aristide remained in office. Nor did they suggest to us anything of a nature pertaining to the conduct of President Aristide in office that would cause us to come to the judgment ourselves that he was unsuited to be the President of Haïti," Mr. Patterson said. The U.S. and France have been accused of using pressure on CARICOM to not make a formal UN request for an investigation into the circumstances surrounding Aristide's removal.

The CARICOM initially refused to recognize the interim government, but in 2006 the newly elected René Préval resumed his country's membership in the organization.

French and U.S. involvement

In 2022, French ambassador Thierry Burkard told The New York Times, that France and the United States had "effectively orchestrated "a coup" against Aristide by pressuring him to step  down and taking him into exile". Another French ambassador, Philippe Selz, told the paper that the decision "to extradite" President Aristide had been made in advance. In response to The New York Times reporting, James Brendan Foley, United States Ambassador to Haiti at the time of the coup, criticized the report's assertion that the U.S. had collaborated with France to overthrow Aristide, stating that "no evidence was presented in support of such a historically consequential claim". He called the claims by the French officials untrue, stating that it was never U.S. policy to remove Aristide. He said that Aristide had requested a U.S. rescue and that the decision to "dispatch a plane to carry him to safety" had been agreed upon following night-time discussions at the behest of Aristide.

On 1 March 2004, US Congresswoman Maxine Waters (D-CA), along with Aristide family friend Randall Robinson, reported that Aristide had told them (using a smuggled cellular phone), that he had been forced to resign and abducted from the country by the United States. He claimed to be held hostage by an armed military guard.

Aristide later repeated similar claims, in an interview with Amy Goodman of Democracy Now! on 16 March. Goodman asked Aristide if he resigned, and President Aristide replied: "No, I didn't resign. What some people call 'resignation' is a 'new coup d'état,' or 'modern kidnapping.'"

Many supporters of the Fanmi Lavalas party and Aristide, as well as some foreign supporters, denounced the rebellion as a foreign controlled coup d'état orchestrated by Canada, France and the United States (Goodman, et al., 2004) to remove a democratically elected president.  A new book on the subject, Damming the Flood: Haiti, Aristide and the Politics of Containment by Peter Hallward, documents the events leading up to 29 February 2004, and concludes that what occurred during the "rebellion" was in fact a modern coup d'état, financed and orchestrated by forces allied with the US government.

In a report published on 28 October 2005, Granma, the official Cuban news service, alleged that United States politician Caleb McCarry engineered Aristide's overthrow.

Some have come forward to support his claim saying they witnessed him being escorted out by American soldiers at gunpoint.

Sources close to Aristide also claim the Bush administration blocked attempts to reinforce his bodyguards. The Steele Foundation, the San Francisco-based organization which supplied Aristide's bodyguards, declined to comment.

According to a Washington Times, article of April 2004

The US has denied the accusations. "He was not kidnapped," Secretary of State Colin Powell said. "We did not force him onto the airplane. He went on the airplane willingly and that's the truth." The kidnapping claim is "absolutely false," concurred Parfait Mbaye, the communications minister for the Central African Republic, where Aristide's party was taken. The minister told CNN that Aristide had been granted permission to land in the country after Aristide himself – as well as the U.S. and French governments – requested it.

According to the US, as the rebels approached the capital, James B. Foley, U.S. ambassador to Haiti, got a phone call from a high-level aide to Aristide, asking if the U.S. could protect Aristide and help facilitate his departure if he resigned. The call prompted a series of events that included a middle-of-the-night phone call to President Bush and a scramble to find a plane to carry Aristide into exile. He traveled voluntarily via motorcade to the airport with his own retinue of security guards, including some contracted Americans. Before takeoff, Aristide gave a copy of his resignation letter to Foley's aide.

The Associated Press reported that the Central African Republic tried to get Aristide to stop repeating his charges to the press.

Aristide has also denied that a letter he left behind constitutes an official resignation. "There is a document that was signed to avoid a bloodbath, but there was no formal resignation," he said. "This political kidnapping was the price to pay to avoid a bloodbath." According to the US embassy translation it reads "Tonight I am resigning in order to avoid a bloodbath. I accept to leave, with the hope that there will be life and not death." A slightly different translation was given by Albert Valdman, a linguistics professor and specialist in Haitian Creole at Indiana University in Bloomington, Ind. "If tonight it is my resignation that will avoid a bloodbath, I accept to leave with the hope that there will be life and not death."

See also
Emmanuel Wilmer
List of wars 2003-current
United Nations Stabilization Mission in Haiti

Notes

References

External links
 2019 Documentary Film on Canada's role in Haiti since 2003: "Haiti Betrayed"
 Peter Hallward Damming the Flood: Haiti and the Politics of Containment, Verso, 2008.
 The 2004 removal of Jean-Bertrand Aristide—Timeline of events
 Extensive coverage of the coup— Provided by Democracy Now!.
 Archive of broadcasts on the Haiti coup and its aftermath—Provided by Flashpoints.
 Haiti Watch—Provided by ZNet.
 PBS NewsHour coverage
 The Week of War – The final week of Jean Bertrand Aristide
 —Naomi Klein's article in The Nation
 A political website dedicated to political activism on Canada's role in Haiti
 CIIA Development and Inequality Symposium Paper (March 2006) – Paper examining repression in the post-Coup period and link to Canadian policy
 Review of Peter Hallward, Damming the Flood: Haiti, Aristide, and the Politics of Containment (2008), Randall Robinson, An Unbroken Agony: Haiti, From Revolution to the Kidnapping of a President (2007), and Alex Dupuy, The Prophet and Power: Jean-Bertrand Aristide, Haiti, and the International Community (2006). NACLA Report on the Americas. November–December 2008. Issue Vol. 41, No. 6. By Jeb Sprague.
 The Other Regime Change by Max Blumenthal, Salon magazine, July 2004
 Operation Secure Tomorrow by globalsecurity.org
 Walt Bogdanich and Jenny Nordberg, The New York Times, 29 January 2006, Mixed U.S. Signals Helped Tilt Haiti Toward Chaos; archived by WebCite at https://web.archive.org/web/20220623123618/http://www.nytimes.com/2006/01/29/international/americas/29haiti.html?_r=2&pagewanted=all

2004 in Haiti
2004 riots
Conflicts in 2004
Military coups in Haiti
Riots and civil disorder in Haiti
2000s coups d'état and coup attempts
February 2004 events in North America
United States involvement in regime change